Raoul and the Kings of Spain is the fifth studio album by British pop rock band Tears for Fears, released on 10 October 1995 by Epic Records. Like the band's previous album, Elemental (1993), it is essentially a solo effort by Roland Orzabal — neither album being made with the involvement of Curt Smith, who had left the band by that time.

Orzabal's primary musical collaborator for Raoul and the Kings of Spain was Alan Griffiths, who acted in the same role for Elemental, co-writing most of the album with Orzabal. Raoul and the Kings of Spain also retained producer Tim Palmer from Elemental. Raoul was a commercial and critical disappointment for the band, becoming their lowest charting album in both the UK and US up to that point and receiving mixed to negative reviews. The failure of the album led Orzabal to put Tears For Fears on hiatus for the rest of the 1990s; he and Griffiths would go on to collaborate on Orzabal's debut solo album Tomcats Screaming Outside (2001).

Background 
Raoul and the Kings of Spain was recorded between 1993 and 1994 by Roland Orzabal, Alan Griffiths, and the band they toured with during the Elemental tour of August-December 1993 (Gail Ann Dorsey, Brian MacLeod, Jeffrey Trott, and Jebin Bruni). Recording sessions for the album took place in Neptune's Kitchen (Orzabal's home studio in Dyrham, England, where Elemental was recorded) and in the Record Plant in Los Angeles.

The album, according to Orzabal, has a recurring theme of familial relationships and delves into his own Spanish heritage. The album's title was mooted as far back as the 1980s as a possible contender for the band's third album (which ultimately became The Seeds of Love). Raoul was originally Orzabal's first name given at birth before being anglicized by his parents to Roland (Orzabal later gave the name "Raoul" to his first son, born in 1991).

The album was originally scheduled to be released by Mercury Records but the project was cancelled after Tears for Fears left the label to sign with Sony/Epic Records. The album was eventually released by Sony in October 1995 with a slightly different track listing and new cover art.

The album peaked at number 41 in the United Kingdom and number 79 in the United States, but was more successful in continental Europe, reaching number 13 in Belgium (Wallonia) and number five in France. It was poorly received by critics, with much of the criticism directed at Orzabal's lyrics, which Tom Demalon of AllMusic described as "either inscrutable or embarrassingly silly". He also described some of the album's musical arrangements as "genuinely pretty, if unexciting".

The album features a reunion with Oleta Adams, who had recorded and toured extensively with the band for The Seeds of Love album, and here duets with Orzabal on the track "Me and My Big Ideas".

The front cover photo titled, Running Them In at Pamplona, is by Jose Galle and is a depiction of the annual "Running of the Bulls" festival held in Pamplona in Spain. Several inner sleeve photographs were by David Tack, taken from his book Impressions of Spain published by Quartet (the Bullfighter on Horseback on page 4 is Rafael Peralta, a renowned Spanish Rejoneador bullfighter). Inner sleeve photos of Roland Orzabal were taken by Pamela Springsteen, shot at the historic Mission Inn in Riverside, California, where the promo video for "Raoul and the Kings of Spain" was filmed.

Subsequent to Raoul and the Kings of Spain, Roland Orzabal dispensed with the Tears for Fears name and released the album Tomcats Screaming Outside (2001) under his own name as his  first (and to date only) solo album. After reuniting with Curt Smith in 2000, Orzabal reactivated the band name and Tears for Fears' sixth album, Everybody Loves a Happy Ending, was released in 2004.

Raoul and the Kings of Spain was re-released in August 2009 by Cherry Pop Records, complete with seven bonus tracks (see below).

Track listing

Notes
 Due to the band's label switch to Sony in 1994, none of the B-sides from the album's singles (tracks 13–17 on the 2009 reissue) are included on the Tears for Fears B-sides collection Saturnine Martial & Lunatic, which was released in 1996 by Phonogram/Mercury, the band's old record company.
 "All of the Angels", "Queen of Compromise", and "The Madness of Roland" originally appeared as B-sides in the UK 2-disc single release of "Raoul and the Kings of Spain." "Queen of Compromise" had also appeared in early promo versions of the Raoul and the Kings of Spain album (which omitted two tracks that would appear in the final version of the album, "Humdrum and Humble" and "I Choose You").
 "Raoul and the Kings of Spain (acoustic)" was originally released as a UK promo single and as a B-side in the single release of "God's Mistake."
 "Until I Drown" and "War of Attrition" originally appeared as B-sides in the UK and US single release of "Secrets."
 "Break It Down Again (acoustic)" originally appeared as a B-side in the European single release of "God's Mistake" and the US single release of "Secrets."
 The only Tears for Fears B-side from this era not included in the 2009 reissue of Raoul and the Kings of Spain is a cover version of Radiohead's "Creep" recorded live in Birmingham during the Elemental tour on 14 December 1993. This track was included in the UK 2-disc single release of "Raoul and the Kings of Spain" and the US single of "God's Mistake."

Personnel

Tears for Fears 
 Roland Orzabal – lead vocals, keyboards, guitars

Additional musicians 
 Alan Griffiths – keyboards, guitars
 Jebin Bruni – Hammond organ
 Jeffrey Trott – guitars
 Gail Ann Dorsey – bass
 Brian MacLeod – drums, percussion
 Oleta Adams – guest vocalist on "Me and My Big Ideas"
 Mark O'Donoughue – backing vocals

Production 
 Producers – Tim Palmer (tracks 1–7, 10, 11 &12); Roland Orzabal and Alan Griffiths (tracks 8 & 9).
 Engineer – Mark O'Donoughue 
 Mastered by Bob Ludwig at Gateway Mastering (Portland, Maine).
 Album Coordinators – Jason Geake and Philippa Sprigg
 Design – Gail Marowitz
 Front Cover Photo – Jose Galle
 Inner Sleeve Photos – David Tack and Pamela Springsteen

Charts

References

1995 albums
Albums produced by Tim Palmer
Epic Records albums
Tears for Fears albums